Hierocles may refer to:

Hierocles (Stoic), 2nd century, Stoic philosopher
Hierocles (charioteer), 2nd–3rd century, presumed lover and court official of the emperor Elagabalus
Sossianus Hierocles, 3rd–4th century, proconsul of Bithynia and Alexandria during the reign of Diocletian
Hierocles, possibly 4th century, co-editor of Philogelos
Hierocles of Alexandria, 5th century, Greek Neoplatonist writer
Hierocles (author of Synecdemus), 6th century, Byzantine geographer, author of the Synecdemus
 Hierocles, a character in the play Peace by Aristophanes